Jalalabad Cantonment Public School and College is an educational institute in Sylhet, Bangladesh.
Jalalabad Cantonment Public School and College has occupied a respectable and glorious position among the leading educational institutions in Bangladesh.

History 
Established on 4 July 1999, the institution is regulated by the Bangladesh Army and approved by the Board of Intermediate and Secondary Education, Sylhet. It offers higher secondary subjects including science, commerce and arts programmes. The institute was awarded "Best Institution" on 18 January 2004 by the president of Bangladesh. Facilities include a 1,000-seat auditorium.

The principal is usually a lieutenant colonel of  
the Bangladesh Army.

The prolocutor of the Governing Body is the station commander of Jalalabad Cantonment and usually is of the rank of Brigadier General.

School
The school section gives the opportunity of studying from class 1 to 10. Students of class 9 & 10 can study science, business studies and arts programmes. In classes 6-10, an English version is available as well as Bangla. The school has recently received "The best school in the district" award.

College
The college section was started in 1999, initially with only a science program. Arts and Business Studies programmes were added later.Students in College have the option to join either scouts or BNCC corps for extra-curricular activities.

Academics
Departments
 Science
 Commerce
 Arts

See also 
 Adamjee Cantonment Public School & College
 Rangpur Cantonment Public College
 Chittagong Public School & College
 Dawood Public School

References

External links
 Official website
 https://web.archive.org/web/20080912231128/http://www.bise-sylhet.gov.bd/

High schools in Bangladesh
Educational institutions established in 1999
Education in Sylhet
1999 establishments in Bangladesh
Educational Institutions affiliated with Bangladesh Army